Operation Feuerzauber or Operation Magic Fire or Operation Fire Magic may refer to:

 German destruction of bridges near Florence, Italy in 1944; see List of Axis operational codenames in the European Theatre
 A German airlift operation in Spain; see German involvement in the Spanish Civil War
 Liberation of Lufthansa Flight 181 in 1977 by West German police commando (GSG 9)
 Celle Hole, a secret service operation in West Germany in 1978

Feuerzauber